Garden City is a residential area of Melbourne located in the City of Port Phillip 5 km south-west of the Melbourne CBD and immediately west of Port Melbourne. It was created as a planned residential development along the urban design principles of the early 20th century Garden city movement, initially by the State Bank of Victoria and subsequently developed by the Housing Commission of Victoria between 1926 and 1948.

The area had previously been undeveloped crown land known as Sandridge Flat, and was considered part of Fishermans Bend, a wasteland of swamps and sand ridges located along the lower reaches of the Yarra River.

The former City of Port Melbourne, which undertook its own social housing scheme at Montague, lobbied the State Government in 1912 to allow social housing to be constructed on reclaimed land, but the Melbourne Harbor Trust had a claim over the land for port use. The State Savings Bank took up the Council proposal and in 1926 the Metropolitan Town Planning Commission purchased 18 hectares of land south and east of Williamstown Road and Graham Street. In 1936 the HCV took over construction of houses from the State Bank acquiring a further 22 hectares to the west, ultimately creating three separate estate areas including Dunstan, Garden City and Fishermans Bend estates. The street layout was laid out on "garden city" principals, and the later HCV houses accommodated large families from deprived circumstances. The HCV built the last public tenanted houses along Beacon and Barak Roads in 1981. In recent decades the former working class social housing, built to alleviate the worst impacts of the depression, have become sought-after inner city accommodation for the middle classes, and houses typically sell for nearly $2,000,000.

There is a small shopping centre in Graham Street built as part of the State Bank stage, while there are five neighbourhood parks in the HCV area, which was not otherwise well provided for with other facilities. The Ada Mary A'Beckett kindergarten, which was built with the support of philanthropic Free Kindergarten Union (1942).

The 1979 Port Melbourne council conservation study identified Garden City as ... a unique example of residential town planning, with a substantial part remaining intact. Specific guidelines have been published to manage repairs and improvements to the houses without losing their heritage value.

The estate includes semi-attached single and double-storey houses in red brick and cement render, including 322 cindercrete semi-detached double-storey "Bank Houses" in six variations which all looked very British, arranged around a series of public open spaces, in a Beaux-Arts layout. Contrary to popular belief, the "Bank Houses" were never public housing and have always been in private hands. The Bank Houses area later became known as "nobs hill", a reference to relative wealth of their occupants compared to the residents of the clinker brick public housing that was added later. The Housing Commission area was known as 'Little Baghdad'.

The Garden City post office in Centre Avenue has been open since 1945.

References

Suburbs of Melbourne
Urban planning in Australia
Port Phillip
City of Port Phillip
Populated places established in 1926
1926 establishments in Australia